Russell Bernard DeVette (July 9, 1923 – November 23, 2009) was an American football, basketball and baseball player and coach. He served as the head basketball coach at Hope College in Holland, Michigan, from 1948 to 1951 and from 1956 to 1977.

Head coaching record

Football

References

External links
 Pro Basketball Encyclopedia entry

1923 births
2009 deaths
Denison Big Red men's basketball players
Hope Flying Dutchmen baseball coaches
Hope Flying Dutchmen football coaches
Hope Flying Dutchmen men's basketball coaches
Hope Flying Dutchmen men's basketball players
American men's basketball players